Macrosphenus is a genus of African warblers, formerly placed in the family Sylviidae. It is one of two genera in that family known as longbills.

Taxonomy and systematics

Extant species
The genus contains five species:
 Yellow longbill (Macrosphenus flavicans)
 Kemp's longbill (Macrosphenus kempi)
 Grey longbill (Macrosphenus concolor)
 Pulitzer's longbill (Macrosphenus pulitzeri)
 Kretschmer's longbill (Macrosphenus kretschmeri)

Former species
Some authorities, either presently or formerly, recognize several additional species as belonging to the genus Macrosphenus including:
 Montane tiny greenbul (as Macrosphenus albigula)

References

 
Bird genera
Taxonomy articles created by Polbot